The Ministry of Finance and Economic Management is a cabinet ministry of the government of Vanuatu responsible for overseeing the nation's public finances.

Ministers of Finance 
Kalpokor Kalsakau, 1980-1987
Sela Molisa, 1988-1991
Sethy Regenvanu, 1991
Willie Jimmy, 1991-1992
Onneyn Tahi, 1992
Willie Jimmy, 1993-1996
Barak Sope, 1996
Shem Naukaut, 1996-1997
Willie Jimmy, 1997
Vincent Boulekone, 1997-1998
Sela Molisa, 1998-1999
Iatika Morking Stephen, 1999-2001
Joe Bomal Carlo, 2001-2002
Sela Molisa, 2002-2004
Jimmy Nicklam, 2004
Moana Carcasses Kalosil, 2004-2005
Willie Jimmy, 2005-2008
Sela Molisa, 2008-2010
Moana Carcasses Kalosil, 2010-2011
Bakoa Kaltongga, 2011
Moana Carcasses Kalosil, 2011
Sela Molisa, 2011
Moana Carcasses Kalosil, 2011-2012
Charlot Salwai, 2012-2013
Willie Jimmy, 2013
Maki Simelum, 2013-2015
Willie Jimmy, 2015-2016
Gaetan Pikinoune, 2016-2020
Johnny Koanapo Rasou, 2020-

See also 
 Reserve Bank of Vanuatu
 Finance ministry
 Economy of Vanuatu
 Government of Vanuatu

References

External links 
 Department of Finance and Treasury

Government of Vanuatu
Politics of Vanuatu
Vanuatu
1980 establishments in Vanuatu